The Dying Detective is a 1921 British short film directed by Maurice Elvey. The film is the first in the Stoll Pictures' short film series The Adventures of Sherlock Holmes.

Plot
The great detective Sherlock Holmes, near death after having contracted a rare and usually fatal Asiatic disease, is determined to solve one last murder case before he passes on.

Cast 
Eille Norwood as Sherlock Holmes
Hubert Willis as Dr. John Watson
Cecil Humphreys as Culverton Smith
Joseph R. Tozer as His Servant
Mme. d'Esterre as Mrs. Hudson

References

External links 

1921 films
British crime drama films
1920s mystery films
British drama short films
British black-and-white films
1921 crime drama films
British mystery films
1921 drama films
1920s English-language films
1920s British films